Raufoss is the administrative centre of Vestre Toten Municipality in Innlandet county, Norway. The village area is located along the municipal border with the neighboring Gjøvik Municipality and the actual urban area of Raufoss does cross the border slightly, including a small part of Gjøvik as well (as defined by Statistics Norway).

Etymology 
The village is named after a waterfall in the river Hunnselva. The first element is raud which means "red", and the last element is foss which means "waterfall". The color red indicates traces of iron in the river bed.

Economic and cultural activities 

The largest employer is what was earlier Raufoss Ammunisjonsfabrikker, now split into several sub companies. These include Nammo, Hydro Aluminium and Raufoss Technology.

Raufoss is also the second to last stop on the Gjøvikbanen railway line. The station also has a local bus service.

The community has an active sports community pivoting around the sports club Raufoss I.L. where the football team has been the most prominent part of the club. Raufoss Fotball currently plays in Norwegian 1st Division.

In addition to sports, Raufoss has an active music community which has fostered such musicians as Ronni Le Tekrø of rock band TNT (band).

References

External links 
 

Gjøvik
Vestre Toten
Villages in Innlandet